Foz do Iguaçu Futebol Clube, simply known as Foz do Iguaçu or just Foz, is a professional football club based in Foz do Iguaçu, Paraná, Brazil. The team was founded on February 9, 1996, and has blue and white as their main colors. Playing at the Estádio do ABC, which has the capacity for 7,000 spectators, they are currently competing in the Campeonato Paranaense, the state of Paraná first division. Foz do Iguaçu women's team once competed in the Copa do Brasil de Futebol Feminino (Women's football brazilian cup).

History
Foz do Iguaçu Futebol Clube was founded on February 9, 1996.

The women's team finished as runners-up in the 2010 Copa do Brasil de Futebol Feminino.

References

External links
Scoresway.com

Association football clubs established in 1996
Football clubs in Paraná (state)
Women's football clubs in Brazil
1996 establishments in Brazil